William Galbraith was an American football coach.  He served as the head football coach at Syracuse University for one season in 1891, compiling a record of 4–6.

Head coaching record

References

Year of birth missing
Year of death missing
Syracuse Orange football coaches